The 1963–64 NCAA men's ice hockey season began in November 1963 and concluded with the 1964 NCAA Men's Ice Hockey Tournament's championship game on March 21, 1964 at the University of Denver Arena in Denver, Colorado. This was the 17th season in which an NCAA ice hockey championship was held and is the 70th year overall where an NCAA school fielded a team.

This was the final year where no distinction in classification was made for NCAA ice hockey. The following year saw 14 members of the ECAC drop down to a new College Division to separate teams on a more equal financial footing. While some would resurface at the D-I level in later years most would remain in the lower-tier leagues.

This was the first season of play for both Wisconsin and Ohio State as university sponsored clubs. While both were members of the Big Ten Conference they did not play the other three member schools and thus did not qualify for the informal ice hockey conference.

Regular season

Season tournaments

Standings

1964 NCAA Tournament

Note: * denotes overtime period(s)

Player stats

Scoring leaders
The following players led the league in points at the conclusion of the season.

GP = Games played; G = Goals; A = Assists; Pts = Points; PIM = Penalty minutes

Leading goaltenders
The following goaltenders led the league in goals against average at the end of the regular season while playing at least 33% of their team's total minutes.

GP = Games played; Min = Minutes played; W = Wins; L = Losses; OT = Overtime/shootout losses; GA = Goals against; SO = Shutouts; SV% = Save percentage; GAA = Goals against average

Awards

NCAA

WCHA

ECAC

References

External links
College Hockey Historical Archives
1963–64 NCAA Standings

 
NCAA